This is a list of notable conferences that promote or practice scientific skepticism.

See also 
 Humanism
 Lists of skepticism topics
 List of books about skepticism
 List of skeptical magazines
 List of skeptical organizations
 List of skeptical podcasts
 List of notable skeptics
 Rationalism

References

External links 

Conferences